Bailey Andison (born November 13, 1997) is a Canadian competitive swimmer who specializes in the medley events.

Career 
In 2019, Andison won a bronze medal at the 2019 Pan American Games in Lima, Peru in the 200 individual medley race.

As part of the 2021 Canadian Olympic swimming trials in Toronto, Andison finished third in the 200 IM. This qualified her for the 2020 Summer Olympics in Tokyo.

References 

1997 births
Living people
Canadian female medley swimmers
People from Smiths Falls
Swimmers at the 2019 Pan American Games
Pan American Games bronze medalists for Canada
Pan American Games medalists in swimming
Medalists at the 2019 Pan American Games
Swimmers at the 2020 Summer Olympics
Olympic swimmers of Canada
Medalists at the FINA World Swimming Championships (25 m)
21st-century Canadian women